West Flanders is a parliamentary constituency in Belgium used to elect members of the Flemish Parliament since 2004. It corresponds to the province of West Flanders.

Article 26 of the Special Law on Institutional Reform of 1980 gives the Flemish Parliament itself the authority to define its electoral districts by decree. The arrondissemental constituencies were replaced by provincial ones by Special Decree of 30 January 2004. This and related provisions were coordinated into the Special Decree of 7 July 2006.

Representatives

References

Constituencies of the Flemish Parliament